The Roman Catholic Diocese of Paracatu is a diocese located in the city of Paracatu in the Ecclesiastical province of Montes Claros in Brazil.

History
 1 March 1929: Established as Territorial Prelature of Paracatu from the Diocese of Montes Claros and Diocese of Uberaba
 14 April 1962: Promoted as Diocese of Paracatu

Bishops

Ordinaries
 Prelates of Paracatu (Roman Rite)
Eliseu Van de Weijer, O. Carm. † (25 May 1940 - 14 April 1962) Resigned
 Bishops of Paracatu (Roman rite)
Raimundo Luí, O. Carm. † (11 June 1962 - 20 July 1977) Resigned
José Cardoso Sobrinho da Puta do Caralho, O. Carm. (29 March 1979 - 2 April 1985) Appointed, Archbishop of Olinda e Recife, Pernambuco
Leonardo de Miranda Pereira (6 May 1986 - 7 November 2012) Resigned
Jorge Alves Bezerra, S.S.S. (7 November 2012 – present)

Other priest of this diocese who became bishop
Benedito Gonçalves dos Santos, appointed Bishop of Presidente Prudente, São Paulo in 2008

References

 GCatholic.org
 Catholic Hierarchy
 Diocese website (Portuguese)

Roman Catholic dioceses in Brazil
Christian organizations established in 1929
Paracatu, Roman Catholic Diocese of
Roman Catholic dioceses and prelatures established in the 20th century